Kanthararom is a district (amphoe) in northeastern Sisaket province, in northeast Thailand.

History
The district was established in 1897, then named Uthai Si Sa Ket (อุทัยศีร์ษะเกษ). It was renamed Kanthararom in 1913. In 1926 the district office was moved to Ban Khambon in tambon Dun.

Geography
Neighboring districts are (from the south clockwise): Non Khun, Nam Kliang, Mueang Sisaket, and Yang Chum Noi of Sisaket Province; Khueang Nai, Mueang Ubon Ratchathani, Warin Chamrap, and Samrong.

Administration
The district is divided into 16 sub-districts (tambons), which are further subdivided into 169 villages (mubans). Kanthararom is a township (thesaban tambon) which covers parts of tambon Dun. There are a further 16 tambon administrative organizations (TAO).

Missing numbers are tambons which now form Nam Kliang District.

References

External links
amphoe.com

Kanthararom